Prince Joseph Clemens of Bavaria (25 May 1902 – 8 January 1990) was a member of the Bavarian Royal House of Wittelsbach and a leading German art historian.

Early life
Joseph Clemens was born in Munich, Bavaria. He was the first child and only son of Prince Alfons of Bavaria and his wife Princess Louise Victoire d'Orléans-Alençon.

Later life
The prince studied Art History and later became one of the leading Art Historians in Germany and Europe. He was also a Grand Prior of the Bavarian Order of Saint George and Knight of the Order of Saint Hubert.

Ancestry

References
 Die Wittelsbacher. Geschichte unserer Familie. Adalbert, Prinz von Bayern. Prestel Verlag, München, 1979

Princes of Bavaria
House of Wittelsbach
1902 births
1990 deaths
German art historians
20th-century German historians
German male non-fiction writers
Burials at St. Michael's Church, Munich